Rose Ranger (born in North Vancouver, British Columbia, Canada) is a Canadian singer, songwriter, music producer and actress. Now with six albums, Ranger performs both solo and with her band. She has written and recorded with some of Canada's top musicians, toured the world, opened for Keith Urban, and her original songs have been featured in The Young and the Restless, Beautiful People, Strong Medicine, Undressed, Joan of Arcadia, Dawson's Creek, Party of Five, Hallmark's The Story of Us, Lifetime's Christmas Angel, Whistler Film Festival, CBC Docs, and feature films including, The Bandit Hound and Deluxe Combo Platter.

Discography

Studio albums

Singles

Filmography

Television

References

External links

Canadian singer-songwriters
Living people
People from North Vancouver
Television soundtracks
Year of birth missing (living people)